The Autovía A-23 is a motorway in Aragon, Spain.

A-23 is an upgrade of the N-330 and N-234. As of June 2020, it starts in the province of Huesca then runs south to Zaragoza. Then, it follows the Jiloca River south to Teruel, through the Sierra d'Espada, to the coast at Sagunto. Plans call for the freeway to reach the French border at Somport where a 8.6-km two-lane cross-border tunnel has been in operation since 2003. The freeway is also known as Autovía Valencia-Francia or Autovía Sagunto-Somport.

Once fully complete, it will serve as an important connection between Valencia, Aragon, the Basque region, and France, through the Somport tunnel. The highway's nickname is "spine of Aragon" since it runs along the north-south through the region.

The A-23 runs through the corridors of the N-234, between Sagunto and Retascón and the N-330 between Retascón and Jaca. The road is new and independent of national roads with two exceptions, one being 10 km from Viver (Ragudo rise), and the other between Nueno and Monrepós, about 75 km south of Somport using parts of the N-330 to cross the difficult terrain of the Pre-Pyrenees mountains. This was the most expensive portion of the highway to build.

Name
The highway's name is derived from, like almost all Spanish "national roads" turned into highways, the first two figures of the old name (N- 23 4> A- 23 ). The letter A is used for highways belonging to the Ministry of Development.

The A-23 also has European nomenclature, as part of the European route E07, which connects Pau, France with Zaragoza, Spain.

In the French section, the route is called RN134, which connects Pau to Oloron-Sainte-Marie and Spain.

History
A-23 is a new highway, which follows the same route of two national roads, the N-234 between Sagunto and Daroca - Retascón, and the N-330 between Retascón and Jaca. Construction began in 1999 from the city of Sagunto and currently sections are still under construction in the north of the province of Huesca.

The section stretching from Calamocha to Romans of the A-23 is 27.8 kilometers long, and cost 98.7 million euros.

The motorway has been completed between Teruel, Zaragoza and Huesca, meaning that all three provincial capitals in Aragon are connected. As of late 2019 the A-23 runs continuously as far as Lanave near Sabiñánigo, but work on some sections north of this point still remains unfinished, as plans to link to Jaca and eventually the French border are yet to be completed. The route also links from Zaragoza to the Cantabrian by the A-68, to northern Navarre, Pamplona and the Basque Country by the A-21 (also unfinished) and to Lleida by the A-22 which is close to completion.

Issues
The stretch between Zaragoza and Huesca presents problems for light trucks when strong wind gusts occur in Cierzo.

In the section Turolense occurred post-construction problems slopes detachment, Chirico and constant danger of affecting the circulation within a few months of being opened and in 2009 had to run resurfacing work to the problems identified waterlogging and subsidence.

On July 22, 2010, a funding cut by the Spanish Ministry of Development forced two sections under construction between Nueno and Jaca, and a third between Jaca and Santa Cilia de Jaca, to be delayed (see diagram sections) for between one and four years. Work has subsequently resumed.

Current Path
The highway currently runs from the town of Sagunto, near Valencia, to the town of Nueno, near Huesca. Between Nueno and Sabiñánigo there are several sections already converted to highway, although some others are either stopped or under construction. The highway also goes straight from Sabiñánigo to Jaca.

At this time there is no active plan for further construction of the 19 km from North Jaca to the Somport tunnel. Instead, the highway will only consist of road improvements and detours through local towns. Currently, the time it takes to go from Sagunto to Somport is ~ 4 hours and 36 minutes.

Sections

05/08/2015: 2016 Proposals: http://www.sepg.pap.minhap.gob.es/Presup/PGE2016Proyecto/MaestroDocumentos/PGE-ROM/doc/HTM/N_16_A_V_2_R_1_210_1_117_1.HTM

Route

Sagunto - Zaragoza

Zaragoza North - Nueno

Nueno - Jaca-Canfranc

References

A-23
A-23
A-23